He County or Hexian is a county in the east of Anhui Province, People's Republic of China, under the jurisdiction of Ma'anshan. The government of He County is located in Liyang Town.

History
From 1965 to 2011, He County was under the jurisdiction of Chaohu. On August 22, 2011, the Anhui provincial government reorganized the province and split Chaohu into three parts that were absorbed by neighboring prefecture-level cities.

Geography
He County is located on the northern bank of the Yangtze River. He County borders Chuzhou to the northwest, Nanjing to the northeast, the three urban districts of Ma'anshan to the east, Wuhu to the south, and Hanshan County to the west.

He County has a total area of 1318.6 square kilometers (509 sq mi), of which 48% is arable land. He County is situated on the Yangtze Plain and has relatively flat terrain in the southeast, with ponds dotting the alluvial plains, with the northwest of the county consisting of rolling hills.

Climate

Administrative divisions
He County has jurisdiction to 9 towns, and its 1 former town and 4 former townships were merged to other towns.
9 Towns

Archaeology
Fossils of Homo erectus, a predecessor of modern humans, were excavated from Longtandong cave on the side of Wanjiashan mountain in Hexian between 1980 and 1981.

Notable people 
Zhang Ji, Tang Dynasty poet and author
Jackie Chan, actor and martial artist (ancestry)
Xu Haifeng, first Chinese gold Olympic medal winner
Shou-Wu Zhang, mathematician

References 

County-level divisions of Anhui
Paleoanthropological sites
Ma'anshan